Trouble is the debut studio album from British hard rock band Whitesnake, led by former Deep Purple vocalist David Coverdale. It reached No. 50 on the UK Albums Chart when it was released in October 1978. This followed the four track EP Snakebite, later available in the US as an import album from continental Europe.

Recording
The album was recorded at Central Recorders Studio in London during the summer of 1978. Martin Birch produced the album, which was recorded and mixed in ten days.

According to Coverdale, one of the reasons the album was called "Trouble", was that his first child was born during the album's recording.

Track listing
Side one
"Take Me with You" (David Coverdale, Micky Moody) – 4:45
"Love to Keep You Warm" (Coverdale) – 3:44
"Lie Down (A Modern Love Song)" (Coverdale, Moody) – 3:14
"Day Tripper" (John Lennon, Paul McCartney) – 3:47
"Nighthawk (Vampire Blues)" (Coverdale, Bernie Marsden) – 3:39

Side two
"The Time Is Right for Love" (Coverdale, Moody, Marsden) – 3:26
"Trouble" (Coverdale, Marsden) – 4:48
"Belgian Tom's Hat Trick" (Moody) – 3:26
"Free Flight" (Coverdale, Marsden) – 4:06
"Don't Mess with Me" (Coverdale, Moody, Marsden, Neil Murray, Jon Lord, Dave Dowle) – 3:25

Bonus tracks
Trouble was remastered and reissued in 2006 with tracks from the EP Snakebite as bonus tracks:

"Come On" (Coverdale, Marsden) – 3:32
"Bloody Mary" (Coverdale) – 3:21
"Steal Away" (Coverdale, Moody, Marsden, Murray, Pete Solley, Dowle) – 4:19
"Ain't No Love in the Heart of the City" (Michael Price, Dan Walsh) – 5:06

Personnel
David Coverdale – lead and backing vocals
Micky Moody – guitar, backing vocals
Bernie Marsden – guitar, lead vocals on track 9, backing vocals
Neil Murray – bass guitar
Dave Dowle – drums
Jon Lord – keyboards

Charts

References

Whitesnake albums
1978 debut albums
Albums produced by Martin Birch
EMI Records albums
United Artists Records albums
Harvest Records albums
Polydor Records albums
Hard rock albums by English artists
Blues rock albums by English artists